"Love Phantom" is the eighteenth single by B'z, released on October 11, 1995. This song is one of B'z many number-one singles in Oricon chart. The song was used as ending theme for The X-Files during the height of its popularity in Japan. The single sold over 950,000 copies within one week. It sold over 1,862,000 copies according to Oricon. The song won "the best five single award" at the 10th Japan Gold Disc Award.

In 2011, the song was certified digitally by the RIAJ as a gold single for being downloaded more than 100,000 times to cellphones since its release as a digital download in early 2005.

B'z became also the first artist to have at least one single charted in the yearly top 10 for five consecutives years. This record was broken by Mr.Children in 2008 (6 years).

Track listing 
Love Phantom
Fushidara 100%

Personnel
 Tak Matsumoto - Electric guitar
 Koshi Inaba - Lead vocals
 Denny Fongheiser - Drums
 Masao Akashi - Bass guitar
 Daisuke Ikeda - Manipulator
 Takanobu Masuda - Organ, Moog
 Keiko Utoku- Female voice
 Naoko Iijima - Female voice
 Akemi Mori - Soprano voice
 Shinozaki Strings - Strings

Certifications

References

External links
B'z official website
 LOVE PHANTOM on B'z no bise (Translation in French)

1995 singles
B'z songs
Oricon Weekly number-one singles
Songs written by Tak Matsumoto
Songs written by Koshi Inaba